Steve Moria (born February 3, 1961) is a British-Canadian (dual nationality) professional ice hockey player. He was born in Vancouver, British Columbia, Canada. Moria has won the IHJUK Player of the Year Trophy three times: in 1994–95, 2007–08 and 2008–09.

Moria began his professional career playing for the New Haven Nighthawks in the American Hockey League's 1985–86 season; he was the last Nighthawk active in professional ice hockey. He moved to the United Kingdom to play for the Fife Flyers in the British Premier Division's 1986–87 season. Moria's most notable affiliation is with the Welsh ice hockey team the Cardiff Devils; he spent 11 intermittent seasons playing for this team.

Internationally, Moria played for the Great British ice hockey team for five years (from the 1994–95 season through to the 1999–2000 season). Moria captained Team GB's World Championship qualification team during the 1998–99 season.

Following four seasons as player-coach with the Slough Jets, Moria was named player-coach with the Basingstoke Bison.  Moria finally announced his retirement on May 11, 2012 at the age of 51.

Awards and honours

Moria was named as a British All-Star player for the British Premier Division's 1986–87 season. He recorded the most points during the British Premier Division's 1987–88 play-offs with the Fife Flyers. He recorded the most points during the British Premier Division's 1989–90 season with the Cardiff Devils.

References

External links 

1961 births
Living people
Basingstoke Bison players
Blackburn Hawks players
British ice hockey centres
Canadian ice hockey centres
Cardiff Devils players
Fife Flyers players
London Racers players
Milton Keynes Lightning players
New Haven Nighthawks players
Nottingham Panthers players
Slough Jets players
Ice hockey people from Vancouver
Swindon Wildcats players
Ice hockey player-coaches
Canadian expatriate ice hockey players in England
Canadian expatriate ice hockey players in Scotland
Canadian expatriate ice hockey players in Wales
AHCA Division I men's ice hockey All-Americans
Canadian emigrants to England
Naturalised citizens of the United Kingdom
Canadian expatriate ice hockey players in the United States
Naturalised sports competitors
Canadian ice hockey coaches
British ice hockey coaches